Michael Mazenauer (born 18 September 1971) is a retired Swiss football midfielder.

References

1971 births
Living people
Swiss men's footballers
FC Zürich players
FC Chiasso players
FC Aarau players
Association football midfielders
Switzerland under-21 international footballers